Saleh Salah El-Sharabaty (born September 12, 1998) is a Jordanian taekwondo athlete and a member of the Jordanian Taekwondo team where he competes in the -80kg weight.. At the Tokyo 2020 Olympic Games, he won silver and thus became only the second Jordanian to win an Olympic medal. Previously, he won the bronze medal on the welterweight division (80 kg) at the 2018 Asian Games in Jakarta, Indonesia.

He started doing taekwondo at the age of seven at the Jabal Amman Centre. He has a degree in marketing from the University of Applied Sciences.

Achievements 
Silver medal at the 2018 Taekwondo Grand Prix in Moscow Gold at the 2018 Asian Championship Bronze at the 2016 Asian Championship Bronze at the 2018 Asian Games in Jakarta Bronze at the 2017 Asian Indoor and Martial Arts Games in Ashgabat, Turkmenistan.

References

External links
 

Jordanian male taekwondo practitioners
1998 births
Living people
Asian Games bronze medalists for Jordan
Asian Games medalists in taekwondo
Taekwondo practitioners at the 2018 Asian Games
Medalists at the 2018 Asian Games
People from Zarqa
Sportspeople from Amman
Asian Taekwondo Championships medalists
Taekwondo practitioners at the 2020 Summer Olympics
Medalists at the 2020 Summer Olympics
Olympic medalists in taekwondo
Olympic silver medalists for Jordan
Olympic taekwondo practitioners of Jordan
21st-century Jordanian people